Eiléan Ní Chuilleanáin (born 1942) is an Irish poet and academic. She was the Ireland Professor of Poetry (2016–19).

Biography
Ní Chuilleanáin was born in Cork in 1942. She is the daughter of Eilís Dillon and Professor Cormac Ó Cuilleanáin. She was educated at University College Cork and The University of Oxford. She lived in Dublin with her late husband Macdara Woods, and they have one son, Niall Woods. She is a Fellow of Trinity College Dublin and an emeritus professor of the School of English which she joined in 1966. Her broad academic interests (notably her specialism in Renaissance literature and her interest in translation) are reflected in her poetry. She retired from full-time teaching in 2011 and a selection of her poems are currently on the syllabus for the Leaving Certificate, the final state examination for secondary school students. Ní Chuilleanáin is a member of Aosdána. She is a founder of the literary magazine Cyphers, alongside Pearse Hutchinson, Macdara Woods and Leland Bardwell. She continues to edit the magazine. She has contributed several recitations of her poems, including 'Small' (written after the death of Pearse Hutchinson), to the Irish Poetry Reading Archive.

Awards 
Ní Chuilleanáin's first collection won the Patrick Kavanagh Poetry Award in 1973. In 2010 The Sun-fish was the winner of the Canadian-based International Griffin Poetry Prize and was shortlisted for the Poetry Now Award. In 2016, she was appointed Ireland Professor of Poetry by the President of Ireland, Michael D. Higgins.

Publications

Poetry collections
Ní Chuilleanáin published with The Gallery Press in Ireland and Wake Forest University Press in the United States.
 1972: Acts and Monuments, Dublin: The Gallery Press.
 1975: Site of Ambush, Dublin: The Gallery Press.
 1977: The Second Voyage, Dublin: The Gallery Press; Winston-Salem, NC: Wake Forest University Press, 1977, 1991.
 1981: The Rose Geranium, Dublin: The Gallery Press.
 1986: The Second Voyage, Dublin: The Gallery Press; Newcastle upon Tyne: Bloodaxe Books; Winston-Salem, Wake Forest University Press, 1991.
 1989: The Magdalene Sermon, Oldcastle: The Gallery Press (shortlisted for the Irish Times/Aer Lingus Award).
 1994: The Brazen Serpent, Oldcastle: The Gallery Press; Winston-Salem, North Carolina: Wake Forest University Press, 1995.
 2001: The Girl Who Married the Reindeer, Oldcastle: The Gallery Press;Winston-Salem, North Carolina: Wake Forest University Press, 2002.
 2008: Selected Poems, Oldcastle: Gallery Press; London: Faber and Faber; Winston-Salem, North Carolina: Wake Forest University Press, 2009.
 2009: The Sun-fish, Oldcastle: Gallery Press; Winston-Salem, NC: Wake Forest University Press, 2010 (winner of the 2010 International Griffin Poetry Prize).
 2015: The Boys of Bluehill, Oldcastle: Gallery Press; Winston-Salem, NC: Wake Forest University Press.

Translations
 1999: The Water Horse: Poems in Irish by Nuala Ní Dhomhnaill with Translations into English by Medbh McGuckian and Eiléan Ní Chuilleanáin, Oldcastle: The Gallery Press; Winston-Salem, North Carolina: Wake Forest University Press, 2003.
 2005: Verbale by Michele Ranchetti, translated by Eiléan Ní Chuilleanáin and others, Dublin: Instituto Italiano di Cultura.
 2005: After the Raising of Lazarus: Poems Translated from the Romanian by Eiléan Ní Chuilleanáin, poems by Ileana Mălăncioiu, Cork: Southword Editions.
 2010: Contributions in The Word Exchange: Anglo-Saxon Poems in Translation, in Greg Delanty, Michael Matto eds., New York: W. W. Norton & Company.
 2010: Legend of the Walled Up Wife by Ileana Mălăncioiu, translated from the Romanian by Eiléan Ní Chuilleanáin, Oldcastle: The Gallery Press.

In addition to the above, Ní Chuilleanáin's poetry is widely anthologised.

Selected academic writing
 2001: As I Was Among Captives: Joseph Campbell's Prison Diary, 1922-23, Cork: Cork University Press.
 2003: The Wilde Legacy, ed., Dublin: Four Courts Press.
 2010: Heresy and Orthodoxy in Early English Literature, 1350-1680, ed., with John Flood, Dublin: Four Courts Press.
 2009: Translation and Censorship: Patterns of Communication and Interference, ed., with Cormac Ó Cuilleanáin and David Parris, Dublin: Four Courts Press.
 2013: Translation, Right or Wrong, ed., with Cormac Ó Cuilleanáin and Susana Bayó Belenguer, Dublin: Four Courts Press.

Notes and references

Further reading
 Anne Fogarty ed., Irish University Review: A Journal of Irish Studies. Special Issue: Eiléan Ní Chuilleanáin Vol. 37, no. 1 (Dublin, 2007).
 Patricia Boyle Haberstroh, The Female Figure in Eiléan Ní Chuilleanáin's Poetry, Cork, Cork University Press, 2013.

External links
 Wake Forest University Press Web page  on Eiléan Ní Chuilleanáin
 Griffin Poetry Prize biography
 Griffin Poetry Prize reading, including video clip
 The Griffin Poetry Prize Questionnaire with Eiléan Ní Chuilleanáin in the National Post
 Poetry Foundation
 Poetry readings available in the Irish Poetry Reading Archive, UCD Digital Library, University College Dublin

1942 births
Living people
20th-century Irish people
21st-century Irish people
Alumni of the University of Oxford
Aosdána members
Fellows of Trinity College Dublin
Irish translators
Irish women poets
Academics of Trinity College Dublin
Writers from Cork (city)
Translators from Irish
Translators from Old English
Translators from Romanian
Alumni of University College Cork